Cecil Algerton "Red" Causey (August 11, 1893 – November 11, 1960) was a right-handed Major League Baseball pitcher who played from 1918 to 1922.

Prior to playing professionally, he attended Georgetown High School.

Minor league career
He began his professional career in 1914 with the Savannah Colts. In 32 games with them, he went 18–11. The following season, he went 16–20 for the Portsmouth Truckers (9-6) and Savannah Colts (7-14). In 1916, Causey went 19–10 in 38 games with the Waco Navigators, and in 1917 he went 17–13 with a 2.40 ERA in 39 games for the Rochester Red Wings.

Major league career
Causey made his big league debut on April 26, 1918 with the New York Giants. That year, he went 11–6 with a 2.79 ERA in 29 games (18 starts). He began the 1919 campaign with the Giants, going 9–3 with a 3.69 ERA with them. On August 1, he was traded with Johnny Jones, Mickey O'Neil, Joe Oeschger and $55,000 to the Boston Braves for Art Nehf. He went 4–5 with a 4.57 ERA in 10 games for the Braves. Overall, he went 13–8 with a 4.03 ERA in 29 games in 1919.

In an unknown transaction, Causey wound up with the Philadelphia Phillies for the 1920 season. With them, he went 7–14 with a 4.32 ERA in 35 games. He began 1921 with the Phillies, going 3–3 with a 2.84 ERA with them, but on July 10, he was traded to the Giants for John Monroe and Jesse Winters. He went 1–1 with a 2.45 ERA for the Giants. Overall, he went 4–4 with a 2.76 ERA in 1921.

Causey played his final season in 1922, going 4–3 with a 3.18 ERA in 24 games with the Giants. His final game was July 29, 1922. He also spent 11 games with the minor league Indianapolis Indians in 1922, going 3–7 with a 4.27 ERA with them.

Overall, Causey went 39–35 with a 3.59 ERA in five major league seasons. In five minor league seasons, he went 73–61.

Following his death, he was buried at Oak Hill Cemetery in Lake Placid, Florida.

References

1893 births
1960 deaths
New York Giants (NL) players
Philadelphia Phillies players
Boston Braves players
Baseball players from Florida
People from Putnam County, Florida
Savannah Colts players
Portsmouth Truckers players
Waco Navigators players
Rochester Hustlers players
Indianapolis Indians players